is a national park in the Ogasawara Islands, located approximately one thousand kilometres to the south of Tokyo, Japan. The park was established in 1972 within the municipality of Ogasawara, itself part of Tokyo. In 2011, the Ogasawara Islands were inscribed upon the UNESCO World Heritage List.

Islands
The islands were returned to Japanese administration in 1968 after US Occupation. The Chichijima, Hahajima, and Mukojima clusters are included within the park, but of the three Volcano Islands, Iwo Jima and Minami Iwo Jima are not.

Flora and fauna
According to the IUCN evaluation for UNESCO, 441 taxa of native plants have been recorded, of which 161 of vascular plants and 88 of woody plants are endemic; the only native mammal is the critically endangered Bonin flying fox; of the 195 recorded species of birds, fourteen are on the IUCN Red List; of the two terrestrial reptiles, the Ogasawara snake-eyed skink (Cryptoblepharus nigropunctatus) is endemic; of 1,380 insect species, 379 are endemic; of 134 species of lands snails, 100 are endemic. 40 species of freshwater fish, 23 of cetaceans, 795 of saltwater fish, and 226 of hermatypic coral have been recorded.

See also

 National Parks of Japan
 World Heritage Sites in Japan

References

External links
 Ogasawara National Park
  Ogasawara National Park
 Map of Ogasawara National Park (Chichi and Haha Islands)
 Map of Ogasawara National Park (Other islands)

National parks of Japan
Natural history of the Bonin Islands
Parks and gardens in Tokyo
Protected areas established in 1972
1972 establishments in Japan